Dehaqan County is in Isfahan province, Iran. The capital of the county is the city of Dehaqan. It was separated from Shahreza County in 2003 to become Semirom-e Sofla County. At the 2006 census, the county's population was 34,149 in 9,550 households. The following census in 2011 counted 34,844 people in 10,602 households. At the 2016 census, the county's population was 34,511 in 11,118 households.

Administrative divisions

The population history and structural changes of Dehaqan County's administrative divisions over three consecutive censuses are shown in the following table. The latest census shows one district, three rural districts, and two cities.

References

 

Counties of Isfahan Province